The Diocese of Münster is an ecclesiastical territory or diocese of the Catholic Church in Germany. It is a suffragan diocese of the Archdiocese of Cologne. Bishop Felix Genn is the current bishop of the Diocese of Münster. He was ordained to the priesthood on 11 July 1976 and was appointed to the See of Münster on 19 December 2008.

Statistics

As of 31 December 2006, with 4.336 million adherents or 47.1% of local population, nearly half the inhabitants of the Münster diocese were Catholic; due to continuing secularisation, this a decreased percentage compared to earlier periods. Sunday Mass attendance reflects this decline over the course of three decades. Per the diocesan website: in 2005, 13.6% Catholics attended Sunday Mass; in 2004, this was 14.5%. A decade earlier, in 1995, Sunday Mass attendance was about 20% (416,406 churchgoers); in 1985, Sunday Mass attendance was 29.3% (614,839 Catholics); and, in 1975, Sunday Mass attendance was 35.1% or 787,582 persons. Over a 30-year period, Sunday Mass attendance declined over 50%.

As of 18 July 2013, there were 1,129 priests, 296 permanent deacons, and 2,540 religious in the diocese.

History

The diocese was canonically erected in 800 by Pope Leo III. It lost territory on 23 February 1957 to the newly established Diocese of Essen.

Ordinaries

Bishops till 1181
Saint Ludger (805–809)
 (809–839) 
 (839–849)
 (849–870)
 (870 – between 870 and 880)
 (from before 882 – 888/889) 
 (899 – 921/922)
 (922–941) 
 (941–969) 
 (969–993)
 (993–1011) 
 (1011–1022)
 (1022–1032)
(1032–1042)
 (1042–1063)
 (1064–1084)
 (1085–1097) 
 (1098–1118) 
 (1118–1127) 
 (1127–1132)
 (1132–1151) 
 (1152–1168) 
 (1169–1173)
 (1174–1203)

Prince-Bishops
Hermann II of Katzenelnbogen (1174–1203)
Otto I of Oldenburg (1204–1218)
 (1218–1226) 
 (1226–1247) 
 (1247–1259)
 (1259–1260) 
 (1261–1272) 
 (1275–1301) 
 (1301–1306)
 (1306–1310)
 (1310–1357)
Adolphus of the Marck (1357–1363)
John I of Virneburg (1363–1364)
Florence of Wevelinkhoven (1364–1378)
John II Potho of Pothenstein (1379–1382)
 (1382–1392)
 (1392–1424)
 † ( 1424 Appointed – 2 Jun 1450 Died)
 † (14 Jul 1450 Appointed – 3 Oct 1456 Died)
 (antibishop 1450–1457)
John of Palatinate-Simmern † (disputed; 11 Apr 1457 Appointed – 20 May 1465 Confirmed, Archbishop of Magdeburg)
 † (Apr 1466 Appointed – 14 Dec 1496 Died)
 † (18 Apr 1497 Appointed – 9 Feb 1508 Died)
Eric II of Saxe-Lauenburg † (24 Feb 1508 Appointed – 20 Oct 1522 Died)
 † (6 Nov 1522 Appointed – 24 Mar 1532 Resigned)
Eric III of Brunswick-Grubenhagen † (27 Mar 1532 Appointed – 14 May 1532 Died)
Francis I of Waldeck † (1 Jun 1532 Appointed – 15 Jul 1553 Died)
 † (21 Jul 1553 Appointed – 2 Dec 1557 Resigned)
 † (4 Dec 1557 Appointed – 25 Oct 1566 Resigned)
John III of Hoya † (26 Oct 1566 Appointed – 5 Apr 1574 Died)
John William of Juliers-Cleves-Berg † (28 Apr 1574 Appointed – 18 May 1585 Resigned)
Ernest of Bavaria † (18 May 1585 Appointed – 17 Feb 1612 Died)
Ferdinand I of Bavaria † (18 Feb 1612 Confirmed – 13 Sep 1650 Died)
Bernard von Galen † (14 Nov 1650 Appointed – 19 Sep 1678 Died)
Ferdinand II of Fürstenberg † (19 Sep 1678 Succeeded – 26 Jun 1683 Died)
Maximilian Henry of Bavaria (1683–1688)
 † (29 Jul 1688 Appointed – 5 May 1706 Died)
Giovanni Battista Bussi (1706–1707), administrator
 † (8 Jun 1707 Appointed – 25 Dec 1718 Died)
Clemens August I of Bavaria † (26 Mar 1719 Appointed – 6 Feb 1761 Died)
Maximilian Friedrich von Königsegg-Rothenfels † (16 Sep 1762 Appointed – 15 Apr 1784 Died)
Maximilian Francis of Austria † (15 Apr 1784 Succeeded – 29 Jul 1801 Died)

Bishops since 1820
Anton Victor of Austria elect (1801, resigned after rejection by Prussia)
Sede vacante (1801–1820) 
 † (28 Aug 1820 Appointed – 18 Mar 1825 Died), Prince-Bishop of Corvey (1794-1825)
 † (15 Jun 1825 Appointed – 3 Aug 1846 Died)
 † (10 Dec 1846 Appointed – 29 Mar 1847 Died)
 † (1 Jul 1847 Appointed – 19 Jan 1870 Died)
 † (6 Apr 1870 Appointed – 13 Apr 1889 Died)
 † (15 Aug 1889 Appointed – 6 Mar 1911 Died)
Felix von Hartmann † (6 Jun 1911 Appointed – 29 Oct 1912 Appointed, Archbishop of Cologne)
 † (7 May 1913 Appointed – 5 Jan 1933 Died)
Bl. Clemens Augustus II von Galen † (5 Sep 1933 Appointed – 22 Mar 1946 Died)
 † (19 Jul 1947 Appointed – 7 Nov 1961 Died)
Joseph Höffner † (9 Jul 1962 Appointed – 6 Jan 1969 Appointed, Coadjutor Archbishop of Köln {Cologne})
 † (7 Jul 1969 Appointed – 16 Sep 1979 Died)
Reinhard Lettmann † (11 Jan 1980 Appointed – 28 Mar 2008 Retired)
Felix Genn (19 Dec 2008 Appointed – )

Auxiliary bishops
Dietrich Schenk, O.F.M. (14 Jan 1394)
Johann Christiani von Schleppegrell, O.S.A. (7 Jun 1428 – 8 Oct 1468)
Johannes Wennecker, O.S.A. (1454–1469)
Weribold von Heys, O.F.M. (10 Dec 1470 – 1477)
Johannes Ymminck, O.S.A. (1472–1484).
Heinrich Schodehoet, O.S.A. (8 Jan 1494 – 1515)
Johannes Meppen, O.S.A. (1495 – 15 Nov 1496)
Johannes Pictor Meler, O.S.A. (15 Jan 1518 – 1529)
Bernhard von Sachsen-Lauenburg, O. Cist. (23 Mar 1519 – 1536)
Johannes Bischopinck (26 Jan 1537 – 1547)
Balthasar Fannemann (Waneman) (26 Aug 1540 – 8 Oct 1561)  
Johannes Kridt (16 Mar 1550 – 16 Sep 1577)
Cunerus Petri (Jan 1580 – 15 Feb 1580)
Godfried von Mierlo, O.P. (14 Mar 1582 – 28 Jul 1587)
Nikolaus Arresdorf, O.F.M. Conv. (23 Nov 1592 – 28 Mar 1620)
Johannes Pelking (Pelcking), O.F.M. Conv. (16 Dec 1619 – 28 Dec 1642)
Johann Nikolaus Claessens (8 Aug 1622 – 1 Apr 1650)
Johann Sternenberg (de Dusseldorf) (7 Oct 1647 – 1652)
Bl. Niels Stensen (1680–1683)
Johann Peter von Quentell (14 Aug 1699 – 13 Apr 1710)
Wilhelm Hermann Ignaz Ferdinand von Wolf-Metternich zu Gracht (16 Sep 1720 – 28 Oct 1722)
Ferdinand Oesterhoff, O. Cist. (20 Dec 1723 – 20 Jan 1746)
Franz Bernardin Verbeck, O.F.M. Conv. (19 Sep 1746 – Dec 1756)
Wilhelm von Alhaus, O.S.C. (2 Oct 1758 – 26 May 1794) 
Kaspar Max Droste zu Vischering (1 Jun 1795 – Münster 17 Dec 1825; Appointed Bishop of Münster)
Klemens August Droste zu Vischering (9 Apr 1827 – 1 Feb 1836)
Franz Arnold Melchers (21 Nov 1836 – 18 Feb 1851)
Georg Anton Brinkmann (15 Mar 1852 – 7 May 1856)
Johannes Boßmann (Bossmann) (25 Jun 1858 – 4 Aug 1875)
Franz Wilhelm Cramer (13 Nov 1884 – 15 Mar 1903)
Maximilian Gereon von Galen (16 Jul 1895 – 5 Nov 1908)
Everhard Illigens (28 Feb 1909 – 2 Jan 1914)
Theodor Kappenberg (27 Apr 1914 – 18 Sep 1920)
Johannes Scheifes (7 Mar 1921 – 30 Oct 1936)
Heinrich Roleff (7 Mar 1936 – 5 Nov 1966)
Heinrich Gleumes (5 Oct 1948 – 26 Aug 1951)
Heinrich Baaken (26 Jan 1952 – Mar 1976)
Heinrich Tenhumberg (28 May 1958 – 7 Jul 1969, Appointed Bishop of Münster)
Laurenz Böggering (25 Jul 1967 – 23 Feb 1979)
Reinhard Lettmann (18 Jan 1973 – 11 Jan 1980, Appointed Bishop of Münster)
Ludwig Averkamp (18 Jan 1973 – 7 Nov 1985) 
Max Georg von Twickel (18 Jan 1973 – 6 Jul 2001)
Alfons Demming (6 Nov 1976 – 30 Apr 1998) 
Hermann Josef Spital (15 Oct 1980 – 24 Feb 1981) 
Josef Voß (Voss) (18 Mar 1988 – 16 Dec 2009) 
Wilhelm Wöste (6 Nov 1976 – 20 Dec 1986)
Friedrich Ostermann (27 Jun 1981 – 18 Jul 2007)
Heinrich Janssen (4 Jul 1986 – 31 May 2010)
Werner Thissen (16 Apr 1999 – 22 Nov 2002)
Heinrich Timmerevers (6 Jul 2001 – 29 Apr 2016)
Franz-Peter Tebartz-van Elst (14 Nov 2003 – 28 Nov 2007)
Franz-Josef Overbeck (18 Jul 2007 – 28 Oct 2009)
Dieter Geerlings (31 May 2010 – )
Christoph Hegge (31 May 2010 – )
Wilfried Theising (31 May 2010 – )
Stefan Zekorn (3 Dec 2010 – )

See also

Prince-Bishopric of Münster
Roman Catholicism in Germany

Footnotes

External links

 Website of the Diocese

Munster
Establishments in the Carolingian Empire
800 establishments
Dioceses established in the 8th century
Munster diocese
Munster diocese
9th-century establishments in Germany